The Little Shop of Horrors is a 1960 American horror comedy film directed by Roger Corman. Written by Charles B. Griffith, the film is a farce about an inadequate florist's assistant who cultivates a plant that feeds on human blood. The film's concept may have been inspired by "Green Thoughts", a 1932 story by John Collier about a man-eating plant. Hollywood writer Dennis McDougal suggests that Griffith may have been influenced by Arthur C. Clarke's 1956 science fiction short story "The Reluctant Orchid" (which was in turn inspired by the 1905 H. G. Wells story "The Flowering of the Strange Orchid").

The film stars Jonathan Haze, Jackie Joseph, Mel Welles, and Dick Miller, who had all worked for Corman on previous films. Produced under the title The Passionate People Eater, the film employs an original style of humor, combining dark comedy with farce and incorporating Jewish humor and elements of spoof. The Little Shop of Horrors was shot on a budget of $28,000 (about $240,000 in 2019), with interiors being shot in two days utilizing sets that had been left standing from A Bucket of Blood.

The film slowly gained a cult following through word of mouth when it was distributed as the B movie in a double feature with Mario Bava's Black Sunday and later with Last Woman on Earth. The film's popularity increased with local television broadcasts, and the presence of a young Jack Nicholson, whose small role in the film has been prominently promoted on home video releases of the film. The film was the basis for an Off-Broadway musical, Little Shop of Horrors, which in turn was adapted into a 1986 feature film. The musical enjoyed a 2003 Broadway debut.

Plot
Penny-pinching Gravis Mushnick owns a florist shop staffed by himself and two employees, the sweet Audrey Fulquard and the clumsy Seymour Krelboined. Located on skid row, the rundown shop gets little business. When Seymour fouls up a floral arrangement for sadistic dentist Dr. Farb, Mushnick fires him. Hoping to change his mind, Seymour tells him about a special plant he has grown from seeds he got from a "Japanese gardener over on Central Avenue." Seymour admits that he named the plant "Audrey Jr.", which delights the real Audrey.

Seymour fetches his sickly, odd-looking potted plant, but Mushnick is unimpressed. When it is suggested that Audrey Jr.'s uniqueness might attract people to see it, Mushnick gives Seymour one week to revive it. The usual kinds of plant food do not nourish the plant, but when Seymour accidentally pricks his finger, he discovers that the plant craves blood. Fed on Seymour's blood, Audrey Jr. begins to grow, and the shop's revenues increase when curious customers are lured in to see the plant. Mushnick tells Seymour to refer to him as "Dad" and calls Seymour his son in front of a customer.

The plant develops the ability to speak and demands that Seymour feed it. Now anemic, Seymour walks along the railroad track; when he carelessly throws a rock to vent his frustration, he inadvertently knocks out a drunken man who falls on the track and is run over by a train. He tries to get rid of the body by throwing it away and burying it in a yard but is nearly caught twice. Guilt-ridden but resourceful, Seymour decides to feed the mutilated body parts to Audrey Jr. Meanwhile, Mushnick returns to the shop to get some cash and secretly observes Seymour feeding the plant. Mushnick considers telling the police but procrastinates when he sees the line of people waiting to spend money at his shop the next day.

Seymour arrives the next morning suffering from a toothache; despite not going to the police, Mushnick still confronts Seymour about Audrey Jr.'s eating habits; while not explicitly revealing what he knows about the plant. Seymour grows increasingly distressed as he realizes that his boss is onto him. After finishing his rant, Mushnick sends Seymour to the dentist; soon after, Audrey runs up and declares that the shop needs many more flowers. When Seymour visits Dr. Farb, the doctor tries to get even for his ruined flowers and attempts to kill him. Seymour, defending himself, grabs a sharp tool and stabs and kills Farb. Although horrified, Seymour feeds Farb's body to Audrey Jr. The unexplained disappearances of the two men attract the attention of Sergeant Joe Fink and his assistant Officer Frank Stoolie.

Audrey Jr. has grown several feet tall and is budding, as is the relationship between Seymour and Audrey. A representative of the Society of Silent Flower Observers of Southern California comes to the shop and announces that Seymour will receive a trophy and that she will return when the plant's buds open. While Seymour and Audrey go on a date, Mushnick stays at the shop to see that Audrey Jr. harms no one else.

While tending to his shop, Mushnick finds himself at the mercy of a robber who pretended to be a customer earlier that day and believes that the huge crowds he observed at the shop indicate the presence of a large amount of money. Mushnick tricks the deranged robber into thinking that the money is where the plant is, which crushes and eats him after Mushnick maneuvers him close enough to it. When Seymour is forced to damage his relationship with Audrey to keep her from discovering the plant's nature, he confronts the plant and asserts that he will no longer do its bidding. The plant then hypnotizes Seymour and commands him to bring it more food. He wanders the night streets and (accidentally) knocks out a streetwalker, who he takes to feed Audrey Jr. Lacking clues about the mysterious disappearances of the two men, Fink and Stoolie attend a sunset celebration at the shop during which Seymour is to be presented with the trophy and Audrey Jr.'s buds are expected to open.

As the attendees watch, four buds open; inside each flower is the face of one of the plant's victims. Fink and Stoolie realize that Seymour is the murderer; he flees from the shop with the officers in pursuit. He manages to lose them and make his way back to the now-empty shop, where he blames Audrey Jr. for ruining his life, but the plant instead asks to be fed. Seymour grabs a kitchen knife and climbs into Audrey Jr.'s maw saying, "I'll feed you like you've never been fed before!", apparently attempting to kill the plant. Later that evening, it is discovered that Audrey Jr. has begun to wither and die. One last bud opens to reveal Seymour's face. He pitifully moans, "I didn't mean it," and the flower droops.

Cast

 Jonathan Haze as Seymour Krelboined
 Jackie Joseph as Audrey Fulquard
 Mel Welles as Gravis Mushnick
 Dick Miller as Burson Fouch
 Myrtle Vail as Winifred Krelboined
 Sandra De Bear (as Tammy Windsor) as Shirley Plump
 Toby Michaels as Barbara Fridl
 Leola Wendorff as Mrs. Siddie Shiva
 Lynn Storey as Mrs. Hortense Feuchtwanger
 Wally Campo as Sergeant Joe Fink / Narrator
 Jack Warford as Officer Frank Stoolie
 Meri Welles (as Merri Welles) as Leonora Clyde 
 John Herman Shaner (as John Shaner) as Dr. Phoebus Farb
 Jack Nicholson as Wilbur Force
 Dodie Drake as Waitress
 Charles B. Griffith (uncredited) as Voice of Audrey Jr./Screaming Patient/Kloy Haddock
 Jack Griffith (uncredited) as Agony Lush
 Robert Coogan (uncredited) as Tramp

Development
The Little Shop of Horrors was developed when director Roger Corman was given temporary access to sets that had been left standing from his previous film, A Bucket of Blood. Corman decided to use the sets in a film made in the last two days before the sets were torn down.

Corman initially planned to develop a story involving a private investigator. In the story's initial version, the character that eventually became Audrey would have been referred to as "Oriole Plove." Actress Nancy Kulp was a leading candidate for the part. The characters that eventually became Seymour and Winifred Krelborn were named "Irish Eye" and "Iris Eye". Actor Mel Welles was scheduled to play a character named "Draco Cardala," Jonathan Haze was scheduled to play "Archie Aroma," and Jack Nicholson would have played a character named "Jocko".

Charles B. Griffith wanted to write a horror-themed comedy film. According to Mel Welles, Corman was not impressed by the box office performance of A Bucket of Blood, and had to be persuaded to direct another comedy. However, Corman later claimed he was interested because of A Bucket of Blood and said the development process was similar to that of the earlier film, when he and Griffith were inspired by visiting various coffee houses:

We tried a similar approach for The Little Shop of Horrors, dropping in and out of various downtown dives. We ended up at a place where Sally Kellerman (before she became a star) was working as a waitress, and as Chuck and I vied with each other, trying to top each other's sardonic or subversive ideas, appealing to Sally as a referee, she sat down at the table with us, and the three of us worked out the rest of the story together.

The first screenplay Griffith wrote was Cardula, a Dracula-themed story involving a vampire music critic. After Corman rejected the idea, Griffith says he wrote a screenplay titled Gluttony, in which the protagonist was "a salad chef in a restaurant who would wind up cooking customers and stuff like that, you know? We couldn't do that though because of the code at the time. So I said, 'How about a man-eating plant?', and Roger said, 'Okay.' By that time, we were both drunk."

Jackie Joseph later recalled "at first they told me it was a detective movie; then, while I was flying back [to make the movie], I think they wrote a whole new movie, more in the horror genre. I think over a weekend they rewrote it."

The screenplay was written under the title The Passionate People Eater. Welles stated, "The reason that The Little Shop of Horrors worked is because it was a love project. It was our love project."

Officers Fink and Stoolie were obvious take-offs of Dragnet characters Joe Friday and Frank Smith.  The film opens up in a similar format to a Dragnet episode.

Production

The film was partially cast with stock actors that Corman had used in previous films. Writer Charles B. Griffith portrays several small roles. Griffith's father appears as a dental patient, and his grandmother, Myrtle Vail, appears as Seymour's hypochondriac mother. Dick Miller, who had starred as the protagonist of A Bucket of Blood was offered the role of Seymour, but turned it down, instead taking the smaller role of Burson Fouch. Production at the Bucket of Blood sets was compressed into three days of cast rehearsals, immediately followed by two days and one night of principal photography.

It had been rumored that the film's shooting schedule was based on a bet that Corman could not complete a film within that time. However, this claim has been denied by Mel Welles. According to Joseph, Corman shot the film quickly in order to beat changing industry rules that would have prevented producers from "buying out" an actor's performance in perpetuity. On January 1, 1960, new rules were to go into effect requiring producers to pay all actors residuals for all future releases of their work. This meant that Corman's B-movie business model would be permanently changed and he would not be able to produce low-budget movies in the same way. Before these rules went into effect, Corman decided to shoot one last film and scheduled it for the last week in December 1959.

Interiors were shot with three cameras in wide, lingering master shots in single takes. Welles states that Corman "had two camera crews on the set—that's why the picture, from a cinematic standpoint, is really not very well done. The two camera crews were pointed in opposite directions so that we got both angles, and then other shots were 'picked up' to use in between, to make it flow. It was a pretty fixed set and it was done sort of like a sitcom is done today, so it wasn't very difficult."

At the time of shooting, Jack Nicholson had appeared in two films and worked with Roger Corman as the lead in The Cry Baby Killer. According to Nicholson, "I went in to the shoot knowing I had to be very quirky because Roger originally hadn't wanted me. In other words, I couldn't play it straight. So I just did a lot of weird shit that I thought would make it funny." According to Dick Miller, all of the dialogue between his character and Mel Welles was ad-libbed. During a scene in which writer Charles B. Griffith played a robber, Griffith remembers that "When [Welles] and I forgot my lines, I improvised a little, but then I was the writer. I was allowed to." However, Welles states that "Absolutely none of it was ad-libbed [...] every word in Little Shop was written by Chuck Griffith, and I did ninety-eight pages of dialogue in two days."

According to Nicholson, "we never did shoot the end of the scene. This movie was pre-lit. You'd go in, plug in the lights, roll the camera, and shoot. We did the take outside the office and went inside the office, plugged in, lit and rolled. Jonathan Haze was up on my chest pulling my teeth out. And in the take, he leaned back and hit the rented dental machinery with the back of his leg and it started to tip over. Roger didn't even call cut. He leapt onto the set, grabbed the tilting machine, and said 'Next set, that's a wrap.'" By 9 a.m. of the first day, Corman was informed by the production manager that he was behind schedule.

Exteriors were later directed by Griffith and Welles over two successive weekends, with $279 worth of rented equipment. Griffith and Welles paid a group of children five cents apiece to run out of a subway tunnel. They were also able to persuade winos to appear as extras for ten cents apiece. "The winos would get together, two or three of them, and buy pints of wine for themselves! We also had a couple of the winos act as ramrods—sort of like production assistants—and put them in charge of the other wino extras." Griffith and Welles also persuaded a funeral home to donate a hearse and coffin—with a real corpse inside—for the film shoot. Griffith and Welles were able to use the nearby Southern Pacific Transportation Company yard for an entire evening using two bottles of scotch as persuasion. The scene in which a character portrayed by Robert Coogan is run over by a train was accomplished by persuading the railroad crew to back the locomotive away from the actor. The shot was later printed in reverse. Griffith and Welles spent a total of $1,100 on fifteen minutes' worth of exteriors.

The film's musical score, written by cellist Fred Katz, was originally written for A Bucket of Blood. According to Mark Thomas McGee, author of Roger Corman: The Best of the Cheap Acts, each time Katz was called upon to write music for Corman, Katz sold the same score as if it were new music. The score was used in a total of seven films, including The Wasp Woman and Creature from the Haunted Sea. Katz explained that his music for the film was created by a music editor piecing together selections from other soundtracks that he had produced for Corman.

Howard R. Cohen learned from Charles B. Griffith that when the film was being edited, "there was a point where two scenes would not cut together. It was just a visual jolt, and it didn't work. And they needed something to bridge that moment. They found in the editing room a nice shot of the moon, and they cut it in, and it worked. Twenty years go by. I'm at the studio one day. Chuck comes running up to me, says, 'You've got to see this!' It was a magazine article—eight pages on the symbolism of the moon in Little Shop of Horrors." According to Corman, the total budget for the production was $30,000. Other sources estimate the budget to be between $22,000 and $100,000.

Release and reception

Release history 

Corman had initial trouble finding distribution for the film, as some distributors, including American International Pictures (AIP), felt that the film would be interpreted as anti-Semitic, citing the characters of Gravis Mushnick and Siddie Shiva. Welles, who was Jewish, stated that he gave his character a Turkish Jewish accent and mannerisms, and that he saw the humor of the film as playful, and felt there was no intent to defame any ethnic group. The film was finally released by its production company, The Filmgroup, nine months after it had been completed.

The Little Shop of Horrors was screened out of competition at the 1960 Cannes Film Festival. A year later, AIP distributed the film as the B movie for their release of Mario Bava's Black Sunday. Despite being barely mentioned in advertising (it was only occasionally referred to as an "Added Attraction" to Bava's film), Black Sunday'''s critical and commercial success resulted in positive word of mouth responses to The Little Shop of Horrors. The film was re-released again the following year in a double feature with Last Woman on Earth.

Because Corman did not believe that The Little Shop of Horrors had much financial prospect after its initial theatrical run, he did not bother to copyright it, resulting in the film entering the public domain. Because of this, the film is widely available in copies of varying quality. The film was originally screened theatrically in the widescreen aspect ratio of 1.85:1, but has largely only been seen in open matte at an aspect ratio of 1.33:1 since its original theatrical release.

 Critical and audience reception 
The film's critical reception was largely favorable. On review aggregation website Rotten Tomatoes it has an approval rating of 92% based on reviews from 12 critics. Variety wrote, "The acting is pleasantly preposterous. [...] Horticulturalists and vegetarians will love it."

Jack Nicholson, recounting the reaction to a screening of the film, states that the audience "laughed so hard I could barely hear the dialogue. I didn't quite register it right. It was as if I had forgotten it was a comedy since the shoot. I got all embarrassed because I'd never really had such a positive response before."

In his book Comedy-Horror Films: A Chronological History, 1914-2008, Bruce G. Hallenbeck called the film "one of Corman's gems, an idea that was born on 'a night out on the town' that's every bit as looney as it sounds." He cited the hilarious performances delivered by the ensemble cast and Corman's strong results while working under the self-imposed pressures of a cheap budget and a fast shooting schedule.

 Legacy 
The film's popularity slowly grew with local television broadcasts throughout the 1960s and 1970s. Interest in the film was rekindled when a stage musical adaptation called Little Shop of Horrors was produced in 1982. It was based on the original film and was itself adapted to cinema as Little Shop of Horrors in 1986, and with another feature film remake announced in 2020. A short-lived animated television series, Little Shop, inspired by the musical film, premiered in 1991. It ran for one season on Fox Kids in 1991. Seymour and Audrey were depicted as 13-year-olds, and the plant, "Junior", was a rapping carnivorous prehistoric creature that sprouted from a fossilized seed. Each episode featured a few stylish music video sequences; Corman served as a creative consultant on the show.

The film was colorized twice, the first time being in 1987. This version was poorly received. The film was colorized again by Legend Films, who released its colorized version as well as a restored black-and-white version of the film on DVD in 2006. Legend Films' colorized version was well received, and was also given a theatrical premiere at the Coney Island Museum on May 27, 2006. The DVD included an audio commentary track by comedian Michael J. Nelson of Mystery Science Theater 3000 fame. A DivX file of Legend's colorized version with the commentary embedded is also available as part of Nelson's RiffTrax On Demand service. On January 28, 2009, a newly recorded commentary by Nelson, Kevin Murphy and Bill Corbett was released by RiffTrax in MP3 and DivX formats. Legend's colorized version is also available from Amazon Video on Demand, without Nelson's commentary.

In November 2006, the film was issued by Buena Vista Home Entertainment in a double feature with The Cry Baby Killer (billed as a Jack Nicholson double feature) as part of the Roger Corman Classics series. However, the DVD contained only the 1987 colorized version of The Little Shop of Horrors, and not the original black-and-white version.

It was announced on April 15, 2009, that Declan O'Brien would helm a studio remake of the film. "It won't be a musical" he told Bloody Disgusting in reference to the Frank Oz film from 1986. "I don't want to reveal too much, but it's me. It'll be dark." When speaking with Shock 'Till You Drop'', he revealed "I have a take on it you're not going to expect. I'm taking it in a different direction, let's put it that way." However, this version of the remake seems to have been shelved.

On December 7, 2016, Deadline reported that Greg Berlanti is set to direct a revamped film of the musical adaptation with Matthew Robinson writing the script.

In April 2017, a modern-day trading card set was released by Attic Card Company. The set includes autograph cards by both Jonathan Haze and Jackie Joseph.

In other media 
Roger Corman's short-lived imprint Roger Corman's Cosmic Comics released a three-issue comic book adaptation of the film in 1995, written by J. R. Williams with art by Gene Fama and Dean Rohrer.

See also
 List of American films of 1960

References

External links

 
 
 

Little Shop of Horrors
1960 films
1960s black comedy films
1960s comedy horror films
1960s monster movies
1960s English-language films
Films directed by Roger Corman
American black-and-white films
American black comedy films
American comedy horror films
American independent films
Jewish comedy and humor
Works based on the Faust legend
Films about plants
Films produced by Roger Corman
Films with screenplays by Charles B. Griffith
Articles containing video clips
American monster movies
Films adapted into plays
Films scored by Ronald Stein
1960 comedy films
1960 drama films
1960 horror films
American natural horror films
1960s American films